John Alcock ( – 1 October 1500) was an English churchman, bishop and Lord Chancellor.

Biography
Alcock was born at Beverley in Yorkshire, son of Sir William Alcock, Burgess of Kingston upon Hull, and was educated at the University of Cambridge. In 1461 he was made dean of St Stephen's Chapel, Westminster, and his subsequent promotion was rapid in both church and state. In the following year he was made Master of the Rolls, and in 1470 was sent as ambassador to the Crown Court of Castile. He was nominated to the see of Rochester on 8 January 1472, was  consecrated Bishop of Rochester on 15 March and was successively translated to the see of Worcester on 15 July 1476 and the see of Ely on 6 October 1486. He was the first president of the Council of the Marches in Wales from 1473 to 1500. He twice held the office of Lord Chancellor, once from June 1475 to September 1475 and then again from October 1485 to March 1487.

Alcock was one of the leading pre-Reformation divines; he was a man of deep learning and also of great proficiency as an architect. Besides founding a charity at Beverley and a grammar school at Kingston upon Hull, he restored many churches and colleges; but his greatest achievement was the building of Jesus College, Cambridge, which he established on the site of the former Convent of St Radegund.

Alcock was appointed to the Council in 1470 and became Master of the Rolls in 1471, soon after being appointed tutor to King Edward IV's eldest son, Prince Edward. After the King's death he was with Prince Edward when he was intercepted by Richard, Duke of Gloucester, at Stony Stratford. Alcock was arrested and removed from office but soon rejoined the council. He was with King Richard III when he entered York in August 1483 and was a member of the English delegation that met the Scots at Nottingham.

Later Alcock was one of several clerics who openly canvassed the proposition that Henry Tudor marry Elizabeth of York. Appointed temporary Lord Chancellor he opened King Henry VII's first Parliament on 7 November 1485 and became one of the new king's most trusted servants.

Alcock died on 1 October 1500 and lies buried in the Alcock Chantry in Ely Cathedral.

Writings
Alcock's published writings, most of which are extremely rare, are: Mons Perfectionis, or the Hill of Perfection (London, 1497); Gallicontus Johannis Alcock episcopi Eliensis ad frates suos curatas in sinodo apud Barnwell (1498), a good specimen of early English printing and quaint illustrations; The Castle of Labour, translated from the French (1536), and various other tracts and homilies.

Citations

References

 

1430s births
1500 deaths
People from Beverley
Lord chancellors of England
Bishops of Ely
Bishops of Worcester
Bishops of Rochester
15th-century English Roman Catholic bishops
Masters of the Rolls
People educated at Beverley Grammar School
Deans of St Stephen's Chapel, Westminster
Founders of colleges of the University of Cambridge

Year of birth uncertain